John Beebe (born June 24, 1939) is an American psychiatrist and  Jungian analyst in practice in San Francisco.

Beebe was born in Washington, D.C. He received degrees from Harvard College and the University of Chicago medical school. He is a past president of the C. G. Jung Institute of San Francisco, where he is currently on the teaching faculty. He is a Distinguished Life Fellow of the American Psychiatric Association.

Professional interests and activities

A popular lecturer in the Jungian world, Beebe has spoken on topics related to the theory and practical applications of Analytical psychology to professional and lay audiences throughout the United States and around the world. He has been especially active in introducing training in Jungian psychology in China. Beebe is the founding editor of The San Francisco Jung Institute Library Journal, now called Jung Journal: Culture & Psyche. He was the first American co-editor of the London-based Journal of Analytical Psychology.

Beebe has also published in The Chiron Clinical Series, Fort Da, Harvest, The Inner Edge, Journal of Jungian Theory and Practice, Psychoanalytic Psychology, Psychological Perspectives, The Psychoanalytic Review, Quadrant, Spring, The Journal of Popular Film and Television, Theory and Psychology, and Tikkun among others. He has contributed book chapters to The Anne Rice Reader, The Cambridge Companion to Jung, From Tradition to Innovation, House, Humanizing Evil, Initiation, Jungian Perspectives on Clinical Supervision, New Approaches to Dream Interpretation, Post-Jungians Today, Psyche & City, The Psychology of Mature Spirituality, Same-Sex Love, The Soul of Popular Culture, and Teaching Jung.

With Donald Sandner, Beebe is the author of "Psychopathology and Analysis", an article on Jungian complex theory used in many training programs, and with Thomas Kirsch and Joe Cambray the author of "What Freudians Can Learn from Jung". He is the author of the book Integrity in Depth, a study of the archetype of integrity, and of Energies and Patterns in Psychological Type: The Reservoir of Consciousness.

An avid film buff, Beebe frequently draws upon American movies to illustrate how the various types of consciousness and unconsciousness interact to produce images of Self and shadow in the stories of our lives that Jung called individuation. His reviews and articles about movies have reached a wide audience. With Virginia Apperson, he is co-author of The Presence of the Feminine in Film. He can be seen discussing film in the documentary The Wisdom of the Dream. Among his better-known papers are “Attitudes Toward the Unconscious", "The Father's Anima as a Clinical and as a Symbolic Problem", "On Male Partnership", "Primary Ambivalence Toward the Self: Its Nature and Treatment", "Toward a Jungian Analysis of Character", and "The Trickster in the Arts".

Eight-function model

Beebe is particularly interested in the way an understanding of typology can foster the development of the capacity to take responsibility for our impact on others. Following up on Jung's theory of psychological types, where the contrasting attitudes of extraversion and introversion colored the judging (rational) functions of thinking and feeling, and the perceiving (irrational) functions of intuition and sensation, he developed an archetypal model of a dialogical self wherein conscious functions contend with more unconscious complexes in the shadow. A person's dominant (most preferred) function is the “hero” (or "heroine"), which is most closely allied with a semi-conscious complex called the “anima” (or "animus"). The hero is also challenged by an “opposing personality”. The next most preferred, or auxiliary, function is the good parent, which may be counteracted by a shadowy witch/senex complex; similarly the tertiary function (“child”) may be  undermined by a more juvenile “trickster”. Finally, the anima may find itself forced to compete with a demonic personality function which threatens to destroy it. A discussion and explanation of this model can be found in C. G. Jung, Isabel Myers, John Beebe and the Guide Map to Becoming Who We Are, by Mark Hunziker (2017)  and in Building Blocks of Personality Type, by Leona Haas and Mark Hunziker (2006) , pp. 177–179.

Publications
 Psychiatric Treatment: Crisis, Clinic and Consultation, with C. Peter Rosenbaum (1975) 
 Money, Food, Drink, Fashion, and Analytic Training (the proceedings of the Eighth International Congress of Analytical Psychology), editor (1983) 
 Aspects of the Masculine, a collection of Jung's essays, editor with a critical introduction (1989) 
 Integrity in Depth (1992) , online version
 Terror, Violence and the Impulse to Destroy (a collection of papers from the North American Conference of Jungian Analysts and Candidates, San Francisco, September, 2002), editor (2003) 
 The Presence of the Feminine in Film, with Virginia Apperson (2008) 
 The Question of Psychological Types: The Correspondence of C. G. Jung and Hans Schmid-Guisan, 1915-1916, co-editor with Ernst Falzeder (2013). 
 Energies and Patterns in Psychological Type: The Reservoir of Consciousness (2017)

See also

 Psychological Types
 Myers–Briggs Type Indicator
 Keirsey Temperament Sorter

References

Further reading

 "John Beebe's Eight-Function Model" 
 "John Beebe – Integrity in Depth" (review) 
 "Understanding the Archetypes involving the eight functions of type (Beebe model)" 
 Angelo Spoto, Review of John Beebe's Energies and Patterns in Psychological Type. Journal of Analytical Psychology, 62/2, March 2017. 

1939 births
Living people
Writers from Washington, D.C.
21st-century American psychologists
Jungian psychologists
Harvard College alumni
Pritzker School of Medicine alumni
University of California, San Francisco faculty
20th-century American psychologists